The Otí language, also known as Chavante or Euchavante, is a language isolate once spoken in the state of São Paulo, Brazil, between the Peixe and Pardo rivers.  The language became extinct at the beginning of the 20th century, and the last ethnic Oti died in 1988. Only a few word lists are preserved.

Greenberg classified Oti as a Macro-Ge language, but he provided almost no supporting data and has not been followed by other researchers.

History
The Oti were largely exterminated in the late 19th century out of fear that they were Kaingang.  Nimuendajú estimated that there were some 50 Oti in 1890.  By 1903, there were only 8, divided between two locations, one a few kilometers east of Indiana and east of Presidente Prudente, between the Peixe and Paranapanema rivers, and one in Platina, some 50 km northwest of Ourinhos.  The traditional Oti lands up to 1870 had been located between these two places.

Vocabulary

Loukotka (1968)
Loukotka (1968) lists the following basic vocabulary items.

{| class="wikitable"
! gloss !! Otí
|-
| hand || insua
|-
| fire || úgide
|-
| stone || racha
|-
| sun || isken
|-
| moon || kuyade
|-
| earth || biroa
|-
| jaguar || kuatá
|-
| fish || eredehe
|-
| house || gobx
|-
| bow || iñesteku
|}

Nikulin (2020)
Some Otí words given by Nikulin (2020), cited from Quadros (1892), Borba (1908: 73–76), and Ihering (1912: 8). For the original word lists by Quadros (1892) and Borba (1908), see the corresponding Portuguese article.

{| class="wikitable sortable"
! Portuguese gloss (original) !! English gloss (translated) !! Otí
|-
| cabeça || head || ursube; ufúbe
|-
| cabelo || hair || eteche; naôdj
|-
| olho || eye || acli, athli
|-
| orelha || ear || aconxe; acóti; kō's(h)a
|-
| nariz || nose || assondlaibe; sonduái
|-
| dente || tooth || vê; ûa
|-
| boca || mouth || afót
|-
| peito || chest || instúa
|-
| mão || hand || insua
|-
| pé || foot || jube; fum
|-
| sangue || blood || astaete
|-
| água || water || ocochia; kos(h)îa; diélsede
|-
| fogo || fire || iná; achô; úgide
|-
| árvore || tree || tajane
|-
| terra || earth || biroa
|-
| pedra || stone || rátcha
|-
| chuva || rain || chanin; béia
|-
| sente-se! || sit down! || roiábe
|-
| deite fora! (?) || throw it away! (?) || bója
|}

References

External links

Alain Fabre, 2009, Diccionario etnolingüístico y guía bibliográfica de los pueblos indígenas sudamericanos: Oti

Language isolates of South America
Languages of Brazil
Indigenous languages of South America (Central)
Languages extinct in the 20th century